A list of songs recorded by American rock supergroup Audioslave.

List

All songs written by Chris Cornell, Tom Morello, Tim Commerford, and Brad Wilk.

Notes

References

Audioslave
 List